Solariella lupe is a species of sea snail, a marine gastropod mollusk in the family Solariellidae.

Description
The size of the shell varies between 3 mm and 4.8 mm.

Distribution
This species occurs in the Atlantic Ocean off Mauritania.

References

 Rolán E., Hernández J.M. & Déniz F. (2005). Description of two new species of the genus Solariella (Gastropoda, Trochidae) from Canary and Mauritania. Visaya 5: 4–11. page(s): 7

External links

lupe
Invertebrates of West Africa
Gastropods described in 2005